Josephine Y. Ramirez-Sato is a Filipino politician. She served as a member of the Philippine House of Representatives representing the Lone District of Occidental Mindoro under the Liberal Party from 2013 to 2022.

Education 
Sato attended St. Theresa's College where she attained a BA Major in Political Science in 1973 where she was included at her college's dean's list. She also attended University of the Philippines where she graduated as a Bachelor of Laws and top 14 among her graduating batch in 1978.

In 1986, she accomplished a program on Instructions of Lawyers-International Law and Taxation at Harvard University School of Law and in 1987 she completed her Urban Studies and Planning at Massachusetts Institute of Technology.

Political career 
In 1988, Sato was elected as Vice Governor of Occidental Mindoro until 1992. After her term as vice governor, she was elected as governor for three consecutive terms (1992–1995, 1995–1998, 1998–2001.) Then served her first term as congresswoman at the House of Representatives from 2001–2004 and was barred by law to run for a fourth consecutive term. After Sato's first term as congresswoman, she again served for three consecutive terms as governor of her province (2004–2007, 2007–2010, 2010–2013). Then after her sixth term as governor, she was again elected as congresswoman of Occidental Mindoro.

In 2015, she was appointed as secretary general of the Liberal Party.

In 2022, she filed her candidacy for governor in the 2022 Occidental Mindoro local elections. She lost to Eduardo Gadiano after only garnering 92,208 votes.

References 

1954 births
Living people
Filipino women lawyers
University of the Philippines Diliman alumni
MIT School of Architecture and Planning alumni
Members of the House of Representatives of the Philippines from Occidental Mindoro
Governors of Occidental Mindoro
Liberal Party (Philippines) politicians
Women provincial governors of the Philippines
Women members of the House of Representatives of the Philippines
20th-century Filipino lawyers